Karen Dionne, (born 1953) is an American writer, whose internationally bestselling 2017 psychological suspense novel The Marsh King's Daughter was selected by Library Journal as one of the best thrillers of the year. The Marsh King's Daughter was recognized as the best book of 2017 by Suspense Magazine, which gave the book their "Crimson Scribe" award, the highest honor the magazine bestows. The Marsh King's Daughter is currently in development as a major motion picture starring Daisy Ridley and Ben Mendelsohn. Translation rights have been sold in 25 languages.

Biography 

Karen Dionne was born in 1953 in Akron, Ohio and moved to the Detroit area with her family at the age of eight.  She graduated from Grosse Pointe North High School in 1971 and briefly attended the University of Michigan before dropping out to marry her artist husband. In 1974 they moved with their infant daughter to Michigan's Upper Peninsula as part of the back-to-the-land movement.

In 2004, Dionne co-founded the online writers organization called Backspace.  She reviewed for The New York Journal of Books and blogged at the Huffington Post.

Her other publications include the novels Freezing Point (2008), Boiling Point (2011), and The Marsh King's Daughter (June 2017), and The Wicked Sister  Her short story "Calling the Shots" was published in the anthology, First Thrills: High-Octane Stories from the Hottest Thriller Authors (2010).

Her environmental thriller Freezing Point was nominated by RT Book Reviews as Best First Mystery of 2008.

Dionne's 2014 novel The Killing: Uncommon Denominator was nominated for the International Association of Media Tie-In Writers's SCRIBE Award in 2015.

Dionne's 2020 novel The Wicked Sister was chosen by Publishers Weekly as one of the best thrillers of 2020.

Dionne's articles and essays have appeared in Writer's Digest Magazine, RT Book Reviews, and Writer's Digest Books.

Awards
 2018, Best Novel, for The Marsh King's Daughter
 2021, Michigan Notable Books, for The Wicked Sister

Bibliography 

Novels

Freezing Point (2008)
Boiling Point (2011)
The Killing: Uncommon Denominator (2014)
The Marsh King's Daughter (June 2017)
The Wicked Sister (July 2020)

Short fiction
"Calling the Shots", in the anthology First Thrills: High-Octane Stories from the Hottest Thriller Authors, edited by Lee Child (2008)

References

External links

New York Times Book Review of The Marsh King's Daughter
Rodger Nichols of BlogTalkRadio interviews author Karen Dionne about The Marsh King's Daughter.
A Dark Fairy Tale: PW Talks with Karen Dionne, by Oline H. Cogdill, April 7, 2017

American women novelists
1953 births
Writers from Akron, Ohio
Living people
21st-century American novelists
21st-century American women writers
University of Michigan alumni
American thriller writers
Novelists from Ohio
Barry Award winners